The Premature Burial, also known as Premature Burial, is a 1962 American horror film directed by Roger Corman and starring Ray Milland, Hazel Court, Alan Napier, Heather Angel and Richard Ney. The screenplay by Charles Beaumont and Ray Russell is based upon the 1844 short story of the same name by Edgar Allan Poe. It was the third in the series of eight Poe-themed pictures, known informally as the "Poe Cycle", directed by Corman for American International Pictures.

Plot
Set in the dark Victorian era, the film follows Guy Carrell, a British aristocrat who is consumed with the fear of being buried alive. His fear becomes so overwhelming, it nearly prevents him from marrying his fiancée, Emily. He tells her that he, like his father, suffers from a cataleptic disease which can make one appear to be dead. Guy then takes Emily down to the family catacomb, and claims that when he was a boy, he heard his father scream from his tomb after being interred, even though his sister insists it was all in his mind. But despite all this, Emily tells Guy that she still wants to marry him.

After the wedding ceremony, Emily plays the melody to "Molly Malone" on the piano which seems to send Guy into a state of abject misery, finally causing him to pass out. After regaining consciousness, Guy becomes even more morbid, obsessed with the idea of being buried alive. He soon builds an elaborate burial vault, equipped with several safeguards in case of his premature burial, including a poisonous elixir to be used as a last resort. This latest project causes Emily and his colleague, Miles Archer, to become concerned with his mental health.

In an effort to change his mood, Guy goes for a walk in the moors with his wife, when he suddenly hears a gravedigger whistle the same Irish tune that was played after his wedding. The music causes him to pass out again, and he experiences a horrific dream where he finds himself trapped inside his burial vault, however, none of his safeguards work. When he finally wakes up from his dream next to his wife, he asks her about the whistling gravedigger, but she insists that she heard no one.

Finally, Emily becomes unable to deal with Guy's behavior, and tells him that either he rids himself of this obsession with  death, or she will leave him forever. This ultimatum seems to work. He destroys the burial vault he constructed and slowly starts to become more amenable. As a final step of his treatment, Miles suggests that Guy open his father's tomb to prove that he was never buried alive. But when he does, it causes him to go into another cataleptic state, and this time, he is unable to awake.

After an examination by Emily's father, he is declared dead. Guy's family concludes he suffered a heart attack, and upon Emily's request, he is buried in the cemetery. It appears Guy's biggest fear is about to be realized, when he is miraculously dug up by a pair of grave robbers just as he regains his mobility. Now in a state of madness, Guy returns to his home to seek revenge on those who conspired for his demise.

Cast
 Ray Milland as Guy Carrell 
 Heather Angel as Kate Carrell, Guy's Sister 
 Hazel Court as Emily Gault, Guy's Wife
 Alan Napier as Dr. Gideon Gault
 Richard Ney as Miles Archer 
 John Dierkes as Sweeney 
 Dick Miller as "Mole" 
 Clive Halliday as Judson 
 Brendan Dillon as Clergyman

Production
Roger Corman had made two successful adaptations of Edgar Allan Poe's (1809–1849) works for American International Pictures (AIP) starring Vincent Price.

He decided to make his own Poe film with financing through Pathé Lab, a company that did the print work for AIP and had backed a few of their productions as well. Corman wanted to use Price, but AIP had him under exclusive contract, so he cast instead Ray Milland. On the first day of shooting James H. Nicholson and Sam Arkoff of AIP turned up, announcing to Corman that they were working together again, as they were able to convince Pathé to bring the movie back to AIP after threatening to pull all future lab work with them.

Corman employed Francis Ford Coppola on Burial as an assistant director.

Reception
Contemporary reviews for Premature Burial were less favorable than those for Corman's previous two Poe adaptations. Howard Thompson of The New York Times praised the "handsomely tinted Gothic settings" and "compelling music", but found the film "static, slack and starchily written." Variety wrote that Corman "seems to have run thin in imagination on this third trip to the same literary well. Not only is the plotting in 'Premature Burial' discouragingly predictable, but its gloomy and cavernous interior setting is peculiarly similar to those in the first two pix." John L. Scott of the Los Angeles Times agreed that the film was "gloomily predictable" and suggested that American International "may be running a good thing into the ground." The Monthly Film Bulletin wrote that "there are some sequences well worth watching, notably Guy's hallucinatory vision of being buried alive", but found that the "outlandish horror" of the original story "is never really caught, and Corman obtains most of his effects from rude shock-cuts rather than from intelligent exploitation of the situations and settings."

Cavett Binion of AllMovie notes, "Milland's performance conveys the requisite amount of hand-wringing torment (in the mode of "The Lost Weekend" movie), even if he fails to capture the manic intensity that Price brought to the other Poe films that he played or starred in. Corman's deft direction, employing a rich palette of colours and superb widescreen compositions, is on a par with the series' finest installments."

On Rotten Tomatoes the film has an approval rating of 56% based on reviews from 9 critics.

Box Office
According to Kinematograph Weekly the film was considered a "money maker" at the British box office in 1962.

Accolades
The film won a 1962 "Golden Laurel" – "Sleeper of the Year" Award.

See also
 List of American films of 1962
 Edgar Allan Poe in television and film

References

External links 

 
 
 Roger Corman on The Premature Burial at Trailers from Hell

1962 films
1962 horror films
1960s English-language films
American horror films
American International Pictures films
Films based on short fiction
Films based on works by Edgar Allan Poe
Films directed by Roger Corman
Gothic horror films
Films with screenplays by Charles Beaumont
Films set in the 19th century
Films set in the Victorian era
Films produced by Roger Corman
Films scored by Ronald Stein
1960s American films